, is a common ward name in a number of Japanese cities.

 Midori-ku, Chiba, in Chiba Prefecture
 Midori-ku, Nagoya, in Aichi Prefecture
 Midori-ku, Sagamihara, in Kanagawa Prefecture
 Midori-ku, Saitama, in Saitama Prefecture
 Midori-ku, Yokohama, in Kanagawa Prefecture